In the mathematical field of graph theory, the bondage number of a nonempty graph is the cardinality of the smallest set  of edges such that the domination number of the graph with the edges  removed is strictly greater than the domination number of the original graph.
The concept was introduced by Fink et al.

References 

Graph invariants